Martin Galliker (born December 24, 1973) is a Swiss bobsledder who has competed since 2005.  He qualified for the 2006 Winter Olympics in Turin in the four-man event, but was named an alternate in place of Martin Annen and Ivo Rüegg and did not compete.

Galliker also finished eighth in the four-man event at the 2007 FIBT World Championships in St. Moritz. In 2008 Galliker was suspended for 2 years after he failed a drug test for testosterone doping.

References
 FIBT profile
 FIBT World Championships 2007 four-man results
 Official website 
 

1973 births
Bobsledders at the 2006 Winter Olympics
Living people
Swiss male bobsledders